Lasse Nielsen (born 10 July 1984) is a Danish sprint canoer who competed in the mid-2000s. At the 2004 Summer Olympics in Athens, he was eliminated in the semifinals of both the K-2 500 m and the K-2 1000 m events.

References
Sports-Reference.com profile

1984 births
Canoeists at the 2004 Summer Olympics
Danish male canoeists
Living people
Olympic canoeists of Denmark
ICF Canoe Sprint World Championships medalists in kayak